The 1941 Wisconsin Badgers football team was an American football team that represented the University of Wisconsin in the 1941 Big Ten Conference football season. The team compiled a 3–5 record (3–3 against conference opponents) and finished in fifth place in the Big Ten Conference. Harry Stuhldreher was in his sixth year as Wisconsin's head coach.

Wisconsin players led the Big Ten in rushing (Pat Harder, 443 rushing yards), passing (Len Seelinger, 419 passing yards), receiving (Dave Schreiner, 249 receiving yards), and scoring (Harder, 58 points). Schreiner was selected by the Associated Press (AP) as a first-team All-American. Schreiner and Harder both received first-team All-Big Ten honors. Harder received the team's most valuable player award. Quarterback Tom Farris was the team captain.

The team played its home games at Camp Randall Stadium. During the 1941 season, the average attendance at home games was 26,212.

Schedule

References

Wisconsin
Wisconsin Badgers football seasons
Wisconsin Badgers football